Virothu Santhosh Kumar (born 15 November 1991) is an amateur boxer from India. He competes in 61 – 64 kg category. Santhosh won Silver medal in 2010 Asian Games held in Guangzhou, China. He was defeated by Daniyar Yeleussinov of Kazakhstan in the gold medal bout by a score of 16:1.

References 

Indian male boxers
Living people
1991 births
Asian Games medalists in boxing
Boxers at the 2010 Asian Games
Asian Games silver medalists for India
Medalists at the 2010 Asian Games
Place of birth missing (living people)
Light-welterweight boxers